Eduard Daniël van Oort (31 October 1876 in Barneveld, Gelderland – 21 September 1933 in Leiden) was a Dutch ornithologist.

Oort was in charge of the bird collections at the Rijksmuseum of Natural History in Leiden; in 1915 he was made Director of this museum, a position which he held until his death.  He was the author of Ornithologia Neerlandica, de vogels van Nederland (1922-1935), with plates by Marinus Adrianus Koekkoek (1873-1944). These plates were later licensed by Harry Witherby for use in The Handbook of British Birds (1938-1941).

A species of Indonesian gecko, Lepidodactylus oortii, is named in his honor.

References

External links
Obituary
Bayer, Ch. (1933). "In Memoriam E.D. van Oort 1876—1933". Zoologische Mededelingen, Rijks Museum van Natuurlijke Historie, Leiden 16: 263–265. PDF

1876 births
1933 deaths
People from Barneveld
Dutch ornithologists
Dutch curators